These places are served by Ukrzaliznytsia (Ukrainian Railways). Stations in Crimea are listed at the end.

Busiest stations 
This is a list of the top 10 busiest railway stations in Ukraine, based on statistics and data received on the year of 2018. The data include only passengers of long-distance trains.

A
 Abamelykove
 Abazivka
 Adabash
 Adampil
 Akkarzha
 Aliiaha
 Altynivka
 Ambary
 Amur
 Andriiashivka
 Antonivka
 Apostolove
 Armatnyv
 Aromatna
 Artsyz
 Aslanove
 Avhustivskyi
 Avlysh

B
 Babakivka
 Badivka
 Bahacheve
 Bakhmach-Kyivskyi
 Bakhmach-Pas.
 Bakhmut
 Bakyrivka
 Balakliia
 Balky
 Balovne
 Balta
 Balyn
 Bandurka
 Bantysheve
 Bar
 Baraboi
 Baranne
 Barkasovо
 Barvinivka
 Barvinkove
 Baryshivka
 Basiv Kut
 Basy
 Batovo
 Baturynska
 Bekhy
 Berda
 Berdians K
 Berdychiv Zhytomyrskyi
 Berdychiv
 Berehove
 Berezan
 Berezhest
 Berezivka
 Bereznehuvate
 Berezovytsia-Ostriv
 Berezyne
 Beshketove
 
 Bezliudivka
 Bezpalivka
 Bila Krynytsia
 Bila Tserkva
 Bila-Chortkivska
 Bilche
 Bilhorod-Dnistrovskyi
 Biliaivka
 Bilmachivka
 Bilmanka
 Bilokorovychi
 Bilopillia
 Biloshytsi
 Bilosillia
 Bilous
 Bilovody
 Biloziria
 Bilychi
 Bilyn
 Birky-Velyki
 Birky
 Blakytne
 Blok-Post 134 Km
 Bl.P.142 Km
 Blok-Post 252 Km
 Bl.P. 346 Km
 Bl.P.412 Km
 Blok-Post 1437 Km
 Blok-Post 1479 Km
 Blok-Post 1504 Km
 Bl.P.1553 Km
 Blotnytsia
 Blydni
 Blyzniuky
 Bobrovytsia
 Bobryk
 Bodakva
 Bodnariv
 Bohdanivtsi
 Bohodukhiv
 Boiany
 Boiarka
 Boikivska
 Bolekhiv
 Bondarivka
 Borodianka
 Boromlia
 Borshchahivka-Tekhnichna
 Borshchahivka
 Borshchi
 Borshchovychi
 Borynychi
 Boryspil
 
 Bozhedarivka
 Bozhkove
 Brailiv
 Brateshky
 Bratkivtsi
 Bratoliubivka
 Briulovetskyi
 Brivky
 Brody
 Brovary
 Brusyn
 Bucha
 Buhaz
 Buialyk
 Bukachivtsi
 Buklevske
 Bukyne
 Burchatsk
 Burshtyn
 Burty
 Bushtyna
 Bystra

C
 Chabanivka
 Chahor
 Chapaivka
 Chaplyne
 Chasnykivka
 Chekhovychi
 Cheliuskin
 Cherednychky
 Cheremushky
 Cherkasy
 Cherniavka
 Chernihiv Pivnichnyi
 Chernihiv
 Chernivtsi-Pivdenna
 Chernivtsi-Pivnichna
 Chernivtsi
 Chernivtsi
 Chervona Dibrova
 Chervonohrad
 Chop
 Chop-Sort
 Chopovychi
 Chornobaivka
 Chornoliska
 Chornomorska
 Chornorudka
 Chornyi Ostriv
 Chortkiv
 Chortomlyk
 Chortoryisk
 Chubivka
 Chudniv-Volynskyi
 Chuhuiv

D
 Dachne
 Darnytsia
 Davlet-Ahach
 Davydiv
 Demchyn
 Demiika
 Demkivka
 Demuryne
 Demydivka
 Depovs Kyi
 Derazhnia
 Derenivka
 Derevyny
 Derhachi
 Desenka
 Devladove
 Dibrova-Olevska
 Dibrovskyi Kinnyi Zavod
 Diivka
 Diliatyn
 Dnipro-Holovnyi
 Dniprobud II
 Dobrotvir
 Dobrovilskyi
 Doch
 Dolyna
 Dolynska
 Domanyntsi
 Donetsk
 Dovbyshche
 Drabove-Bariatynske
 Dranytsia
 Drohobych
 Druzhkivka
 Dubivtsi
 Dubky
 Dubliany-Lvivski
 Dubliany-Samb.
 Dubno
 Dubove
 Duboviazivka
 Dubrovytsia
 Dubrynychi
 Dubynka
 Dunaivtsi
 Dvoretska
 Dvorichna
 Dzhyhaivka
 Dzynilor

E
 Erastivka
 Eskhar

F
 Fastiv I
 Fastiv Ii
 Fedorivka
 Fisaky
 Forpostna
 Fundukliivka

H
 Hadiach Im. Serhiienka M.I.
 Hadynkivtsi
 Halahanivka
 Haleshchyna
 Halych
 Halyne
 Hannivka
 Hannusyne
 Havrylivka
 Havryshi
 Hazove
 Heikivka
 Hersevanivskyi
 Hirnyk
 Hlavani
 Hlibovychi
 Hlobyne
 Hlukhivtsi
 Hlybochok-Velykyi
 Hlyboka-Bukovynska
 Hlyniana
 Hlynna-Navariia
 Hnadental
 Hnidava
 Hnivan
 Hody-Turka
 Hoholev
 Holendry
 Holoby
 Holoskiv
 Holovashivka
 Holubychi
 Horbashi
 Hordiivka
 Hordyshivka
 Horiainove
 Horikhovyi Hai
 Hornostaivka
 Horodenka-Zavod
 Horodnia
 Horodok-Lvivskyi
 Horodok
 Horodyshche
 Horokhiv
 Horokhivka
 Horozhene
 Hrabarivka
 Hrakove
 Hranitnyi
 Hrazhdanskyi
 Hrebeniv
 Hrebinka
 Hrechany
 Hreihove
 Hroza
 Hruzke
 Hrybova Rudnia
 Hryhorivka
 Hubarivka
 Hubnyk
 Hulivtsi
 Humentsi
 Husakove
 Husarivka
 Hvizdets

I
 Ichnia
 Ihnatpil
 Ihren
 Ilarionove
 Im. Borysa Oliinyka
 Im. Heorhiia Kirpy
 Im. Kozhushko O.M.
 Im. Oleha Kriuchkova
 Im. Vasylia Nesvita
 Im. Tarasa Shevchenka
 Irpin
 Irsha
 Iskrene
 Iusen
 Ivachkove
 Ivanivka
 Ivankivtsi
 Ivano-Frankivsk
 Ivano-Kopyne
 Ivanychi
 Ivkivka
 Ivotka
 Izium
 Izmail
Izvaryne

K
 Kabanne
 Kahamlytska
 Kaharlyk
 Kakhovka
 Kalchyk
 Kalinindorf
 Kalush
 Kalyniv
 Kalynivka I
 Kalynivka Ii
 Kalynivka
 Kam Yans Ke-Pas.
 Kamiane Pole
 Kamianets-Podilskyi
 Kamianka-Buzka
 Kamianka
 Kamianyi Mist
 Kamianytsia-Volynska
 Kamianytsia
 Kamka
 Kanatove
 Kankrynivka
 Kantemyr
 Kantserivka
 Kaolinova
 Kapitanivka
 Kapustyne
 Karan
 Karapyshi
 Karavaievi Dachi
 Karlivka
 Karolina-Buhaz
 Karpaty
 Karpove
 Karpylivka
 Kavuny
 Kazanka
 Kehychivka
 Khaichnoryn
 Khaliavyn
 Khalymonove
 Kharkiv-Pasazhirskyi
 Kharliivka
 Kherson Nalyvny
 Kherson-Skhidnyi
 Kherson
 Khlibodarivka
 Khlystunivka
 Khmelnytskyi
 Khmilnyk
 Khodoriv
 Kholonivska
 Khorobychi
 Khorol
 Khoroshe Ozero
 Khorostkiv
 Khrolyn
 Khryplyn
 Khrystynivka
 Khust
 Khutir Khalymonove
 Khutir-Mykhailivskyi
 Kindrativka
 Kinetspil
 Kitsman
 Kivertsi
 Klavdiievo
 Klepaly
 Klesiv
 Klevan
 Kliucharky
 Klymashivka
 Kniazheve
 Kobeliaky
 Kobyzhcha
 Kochubeivka
 Kodnia
 Kodyma
 Kolchyno
 Koliinyi Post 13 Km
 Koliinyi Post 22 Km
 Koliinyi Post 25 Km
 Koliinyi Post 48 Km
 Koliinyi Post 74 Km
 Koliinyi Post 116 Km
 Koliinyi Post 127 Km
 Koliinyi Post 142 Km
 Koliinyi Post 143 Km
 Koliinyi Post 155 Km
 Koliinyi Post 200 Km
 Koliinyi Post 311 Km
 Koliinyi Post 882 Km
 Koliinyi Post 894 Km
 Kolodianka
 Kolodiazhnyi
 Kolodno
 Kolomak
 Kolomie
 Kolomiitseve
 Kolomyia
 Kolosivka
 Kolychivka
 Komarivtsi
 Komarne
 Komysh-Zoria
 Koniukhiv
 Kononivka
 Konotop-Pas.
 Konotop-Tov.
 Konovalove
 
 Kopani
 Kopychyntsi
 Kordyshivka
 Korobochkyne
 Koroleve
 Korolivka
 Koropuzh
 Korosten-Zhytomyrskyi
 Korosten-Podilskyi
 Korosten-Pz
 Korosten
 Korshiv
 Korsun
 Korystivka
 Korzhivtsi
 Kosari
 Koshary
 Kosmyn
 Kostiantynivka
 Kostopil
 Kostryno
 Kostryzhivka
 Kosyny
 Kotiuzhany
 Kotlabukh
 Kotliareve
 Kovel
 Koviahy
 Kovsharivka
 Kozacha Lopan
 Kozachivka
 Kozatske
 Kozelshchyna
 Kozhanka
 Koziatyn I
 Koziatyn II
 Kramators K
 Krasne-Pas.
 Krasne
 Krasnohrad
 Krasnopavlivka
 Krasnosilka
 Krasyliv
 Kremenchuk
 Kreminne
 Kremne
 Kremydivka
 Kriukiv-Na-Dnipri
 Krolevets
 Kropyvnyts Kyi
 Kruty
 Kryvokhatky
 Kryvyi Rih-Holovnyi
 Kryvyi Rih-Sortuvalnyi
 Kryvyi Rih-Zakhidnyi
 Kryvyi Rih
 Kryvyn
 Kryzhopil
 Kseniieve
 Kublych
 Kuchurhan
 Kudashivka
 Kukilka
 Kulbakyne
 Kulevcha
 Kulyndorove
 Kupiansk-Sortuv.
 Kupiansk-Vuzlovyi
 Kupiansk
 Kupievakha
 Kurylivka
 Kushuhum
 Kutsivka
 Kuzemivka
 Kuznychi
 Kvasy
 Kvasyliv
 Kybyntsi
 Kyiv M
 Kyiv-Demiivskyi
 Kyiv-Pasazhyrskyi
 Kyiv-Tovarnyi
 Kyiv-Volynskyi
 Kyrnasivka
 Kyrpotyne
 Kyrykivka
 Kyrylivka
 Kyslivka

L
 Ladyzhyn
 Lankoskladalne
 Lanna
 Larga
 Larha
 Lavochne
 Lazeshchyna
 Lazirky
 Lekhucheny
 Lelekivka
 Lepetykha
 Levkovychi
 Lezhyne
 Likarivka
 Lishchynivka
 Liubashivka
 Liubavka
 Liubin-Velykyi
 Liublynets-Volynskyi
 Liuboml
 Liubomyrsk
 Liubotyn-Zakhidnyi
 Liubotyn
 Liubyntsi
 Liubytiv
 Liudmylivka
 Lokhvytsia
 Lotskine
 Lozhava
 Lozova
 Lubny
 Luhansk
 Luhyny
 Lukoshko
 Lutsk
 Luzhany
 Lviv
 Lviv Suburban
 Lykhachove
 Lyman
 Lynovytsia
 Lypiv Rih
 Lysychansk

M
 Mahala
 Maidan-Vyla
 Makoshyne
 Makove
 Maksymivka-Ternopilska
 Maksymivka
 Mala Pereshchepynska
 Mala Tokmachka
 Mala Yazvynka
 Maliiky
 Maloilshivska Pp
 Malyn
 Malyns K
 Malynychi
 Mamaivtsi
 Mamalyha
 Manchenky
 Manevychi
 Mardarivka
 Marhanets
 Marianivka
 Mariupol
 Markivtsi
 Martynivska
 Marzhanivka
 Mateikove
 Matiashivka
 Matiivtsi
 Matrosivka
 Matseiv
 Mazurivka
 Mederove
 Mekhedivka
 Mel Nia
 Melitopol-Pas
 Mena
 Merchyk
 Merefa
 Mezhova
 Mishkove
 Mohyliany
 Mohyliv-Podilskyi
 Mohylivka
 Mokhnach
 Mokvyn
 Molochans K
 Morshyn
 Moshchanytsia
 Mostyska I
 Mostyska II
 Motovylivka
 Movchanove
 Mshana
 Mudrona
 Mukacheve
 Muraviika
 Musiivka
 Myhaieve
 Mykhailenky
 Mykolaieve
 Mykolaiv-Dnistrovskyi
 Mykolaiv
 Mykolaivka
 Mykulychyn
 Mykulyntsi-Strusiv
 Mylashenkove
 Myliachi
 Myloradivka
 Myrhorod
 Myronivka
 Myropil
 Myroslavka
 Myrova

N
 N.D.Vuzol-Park E
 Nadvirna
 Narkevychi
 Nasvitevych
 Nedanchychi
 Nelhivka
 Nemishaieve
 Nemovychi
 Nepliuieve
 Nepolokivtsi
 Nesvich-Volynskyi
 Nihyn
 Nikopol
 Nikopolbud
 Nizhyn
 Nosivka
 Nova Bavariia
 Nova Borova
 Novi Bezradychi
 Novi Sanzhary
 Novoblochna
 Novodanylivka
 Novodibrivka
 Novodmytrivskyi
 Novohrad-Volynskyi I
 Novohupalivka
 Novokarlivka
 Novokaterynivka
 Novomyrhorod
 Novooleksiivka
 Novopoltavka
 Novoselivka
 Novoselytsia
 Novoukrainka
 Novovesela
 Novychi
 Novyi Buh
 Nyzhnodniprovsk-Vuzol
 Nyzhnodniprovsk
 Nyziany
 Nyzkivka

O
 Obariv
 Obh. Punkt 309 Km
 Obilna
 Obkhidna
 Obroshyn
 Obshcha
 Obvidnyi
 Odesa-Holovna
 Odesa-Mala
 Odesa-Peresyp
 Odesa-Poizna
 Odesa-Skhidna
 Odesa-Sortuvalna
 Odesa-Zakhidna
 Odesa-Zastava I
 Odesa-Zastava Ii
 Odessa
 Ohultsi
 Oldysh
 Oleksandriia
 Oleksandrivka
 Oleksyne
 Olevs K
 Oliinykove
 Olshanytsia
 Olyka
 Omelianivka
 Orchyk
 Orepy
 Orikhivska
 Orilka
 Orlyk
 Osniahy
 Osnova
 Osnova
 Ostky
 Ostroh
 Otyniia
 Ovadne
 Ovruch
 Ozeriany
 Ozerna
 Ozernyi
 Ozhydiv-Olesko

P
 Pal Mira
 Paniutyne
 Panske
 Pantaivka
 Park N (Lyubotyn)
 Park N Udy
 Park Skhidn.Prybuttya
 Parpurivskyi
 Partyzany
 Paryzka
 Pasichnyi
 Pavlohrad I
 Pechanivka
 Penyzevychi
 Perechyn
 Peredatna
 Pereddonbasivska
 Peredhirkovyi Park
 Perehonivka
 Pereiaslavska
 Perekhrestove
 Pereloty
 Perepys
 Perespa
 Persenkivka
 Pervenets
 Pervomaisk-Na-Buzi
 Pervomaiske-Pivdene
 Petrivka
 Petro Kryvonis
 Piatykhatky-Stykova
 Piatykhatky
 Pichuhino
 Pidbirtsi
 Pidhirtsi
 Pidhorodna
 Pidstepne
 Pidvolochysk
 Pidzamche
 Pisochna
 Pivdenny Post
 Pivnichna 3 Pl.
 Pivnichna
 Pivnichny Post
 Platforma 40 Km
 Plavni Vantazhni
 Plavni-Pas.
 Pletenyi Tashlyk
 Plodorodna
 Plysky
 Poberezhzhia
 Podibne
 Podilsk-Pivd.
 Podilsk
 Podusivka
 Poiasky
 Pokotylivka
 Pokrovk
 Poliany
 Polivskyi
 Polohy
 Polonne
 Poltava-Kyivska
 Poltava-Pivdenna
 Poltava
 Pomichna
 Poninky
 Popeliukhy
 Popilnia
 Post 4 Km
 Post 6 Km Bakhm
 Post 7 Km
 Post 8 Km
 Post 15 Km
 Post 21 Km
 Post 26 Km
 Post 33 Km
 Post 37 Km
 Post 41 Km
 Post 43 Km
 Post 45 Km
 Post 50 Km
 Post 51 Km
 Post 57 Km
 Post 64 Km
 Post 69 Km
 Post 70 Km
 Post 74 Km
 Post 81 Km
 Post 86 Km
 Post 92 Km
 Post 104 Km
 Post 116 Km
 Post 127 Km
 Post 132 Km
 Post 139 Km
 Post 144 Km
 Post 146 Km
 Post 151 Km
 Post 167 Km
 Post 172 Km
 Post 190 Km
 Post 227 Km
 Post 237 Km
 Post 296 Km
 Post 837 Km
 Post 887 Km
 Post 900 Km
 Post 910 Km
 Post 924 Km
 Post 939 Km
 Post 1090 Km
 Post 1141 Km
 Post 1154 Km
 Post Zhlobynskyi
 Post-Pivdennyi
 Post-Vorskla
 Potapovychi
 Potash
 Potoky
 Pototske
 Povursk
 Priazhiv
 Prokopivka Obp
 Proshova
 Prosiana Im Pryklonskoho V V
 Prostore
 Protasiv Yar
 Prybytky
 Prydonetska
 Pryluky
 Pryosternyi
 Pryshyb
 Pryvorot
 Pustomyty
 Putiiska
 Putyvl
 Pyriatyn
 Pysarshchyna
 Pysmenna

R
 Rachky
 Radekhiv
 Radkivski Pisky
 Radulyno
 Radushna
 Radyvyliv
 Rafalivka
 Raihorod
 Raiky
 Rakhiv
 Rakhny
 Raukhivka
 Razine
 Rechovyi Rynok
 Reia
 Reshchutsk
 Reshetylivka
 Ripky Bp
 Rivne
 Robocha
 Rohyntsi
 Rokosiv
 Rokuvata
 Rokytne-Volynske
 Rokytne
 Romankivtsi
 Romny
 Romodan
 Rosava
 Rostushcha
 Rotok
 Rozdilna I
 Rozdilna-Sortuvalna
 Rozdory
 Rozhniativ
 Rozhyshche
 Rozivka
 Rozizd 1 Km
 Rozizd 5 Km
 Rozizd 10 Km
 Rozizd 44 Km
 Rozizd 50 Km
 Rozizd 75 Km
 Rozizd 142 Km
 Rozizd 309 Km
 Rozizd 328 Km
 Rozizd 393 Km
 Rozizd 805 Km
 Rozizd 854 Km
 Rozizd 898 Km
 Rozkoshivka
 Rozsokhuvatka
 Rubanka
 Rubizhne
 Rublivka
 Rubtsi
 Rudky
 Rudne
 Rudne
 Rudnia-Pochaivska
 Rudnytsia
 Rupyne
 Rykhalska

S
 Sadhora
 Sahaidak
 Sakharna
 Sakhnovshchyna
 Saksahan
 Salnytskyi Pp
 Sambir
 Samiilivka
 Sapizhanka
 Sarata
 Sarny
 Sartana
 Savertsi
 Savro
 Savyntsi
 Seleshchyna
 Selo-Kamianka
 Selyshchanskyi
 Selyshche Lisove
 Semeniv Yar
 Semylitka
 Sencha
 Senkevychivka
 Serbka
 Serbynivtsi
 Serdiukivka
 Sestrynivka
 Shabo
 Shalaska
 Sharivka
 Shatryshche
 Shchaslyva
 Shchebenevyi
 Shcherbyn
 Shchyrets Ii
 Shebelynka
 Shepetivka
 Shevchenko
 Shevchenkove-Pivdenne
 Shmakove
 Sholomsk
 Shostakivka
 Shostka
 Shpola
 Shpychkyne
 Shuryne
 Shvedska Mohyla
 Shydlovska
 Shyshaky
 Sianky
 Sil
 Simferopol
 Sirohozy
 Siversk
 Skibneve
 Sknyliv
 Skole
 Skorokhodove
 Skorosnyi
 Skotarske
 Skriahivka
 Slatyne
 Slavhorod-Pivdennyi
 Slavske
 Slavuta-1
 Slavutych
 Slobidka
 Slobidska
 Sloviansk
 Slovianskyi Kurort
 Smila
 Smorodyne
 Sniatyn
 Snihurivka
 Snov
 Snovsk
 Sofiivka
 Sokal
 Sokolohirne
 Sokolyky
 Sokoryky
 Sokyriany
 Solomirka
 Solonytska
 Solotvyno I
 Solotvyno Ii
 Solotvyno-Likarnia
 Solovka
 Sorochyi Brid
 Sosnivka
 Sosonka Obp
 Sotnyky
 Spartak
 Spytsyn
 Stare Selo
 Starokostiantyniv Ii
 Starovirivka
 Staryi Luh
 Staryi Sambir
 Stavchany
 Stavne
 Stebnyk
 Stefaneshty
 Stepanivka
 Stoianiv
 Strabychovo
 Strashiv
 Strilky
 Strilsk
 Strokovyi
 Strokovytsi
 Strumkivka
 Stryi-2
 Stryi
 Stulneve
 Sudova Vyshnia
 Sudylkiv
 Sukhachivka
 Sukholisy
 Sukhyny
 Sula
 Sumy-Tovarna
 Sumy
 Suprunivka
 Svaliava
 Svatove
 Sviatohirsk
 Sviatoshyn
 Svitlodolynske
 Svynkivka
 Syhnaivka
 Sykhiv
 Synelnykov
 Synelnykove I
 Synelnykove Ii
 Synia Hora
 Syrovatka

T
 Tahancha
 Talalaivka
 Talne
 Tarnavshchyna
 Tarnovytsia
 Tartak
 Tashbunar
 Tashchenak
 Tatariv
 Tavriisk
 Teplytsia
 Tereshchenska
 Teresva
 Ternivka-Mykolaivska
 Ternopil Vant.P.
 Ternopil
 Ternove
 Teteriv
 Tiachiv
 Tik
 Tiushky
 Tluste
 Tomashhorod
 Topoli
 Toporyshche
 Torokhtianyi
 Toropylivka
 Tors Ke
 Tovkachivskyi
 Travnevyi
 Trepivka
 Treмbovlia
 Triichate
 Troianivka
 Troiany
 Tropa
 Truskavets
 Trykhaty
 Trykratne
 Trypillia-Dniprovske
 Tsenzhiv
 Tsuman
 Tsvitkove
 Tsvitokha
 Tsybuleve
 Tsyhanska
 Tukhlia
 Turiis K
 Turka
 Turkuly
 Tymkove
 Tysivtsi

U
 Udachna
 Udrytsk
 Uhryniv
 Ukrainka
 Ukrainska
 Uladivka
 Ulianivka
 Umantsivka
 Usatove
 Ushomyr
 Ushytsia
 Ustynivka
 Ustynivka
 Uzhhorod

V
 Vadul-Siret
 Vakulenchuk
 Vakulyntsi
 Vanchykivtsi
 Vankovychy
 Vapniarka
 Vapniarky
 Varvarivka
 Varvarivskyi
 Vaskautsy
 Vasylkiv I
 Vatutine
 Vechirnyi Kut
 Velidnyky
 Velyka Zahorivka
 Velykyi Bereznyi
 Velykyi Kuchuriv
 Velykyi Tokmak
 Vendychany
 Veneslavivka
 Verba
 Verbky
 Verenchanka
 Veresoch
 Verkhivtseve
 Verkhnesynovyde
 Verkhni Hai
 Verkhnii Tokmak I
 Verkhnii Tokmak II
 Verkhnodniprovsk
 Vernyhorodok
 Vershnytsia
 Vertiivka
 Veselka
 Veselyi Kut
 Veselyi Podil
 Veselynove
 Viazove
 Viitivtsi
 Vilniansk
 Vilnohirsk
 Vinnytsia Vantazhna
 Vinnytsia
 Virivka
 Vodiana
 Volnovakha
 Volochysk
 Volodymyr-Volynskyi
 Volodymyrivka
 Voloka
 Volosianka-Zakarpatska
 Volovets
 Vorokhta
 Voronenko
 Voronkivtsi
 Vorozhba-Tov.
 Vorozhba
 Vorshytsia
 Vorskla
 Voskobiinia
 Vovchyi
 Vozliakove
 Voznesens K
 Vradiivka
 Vybranivka
 Vydubychi
 Vydyniv
 Vyhnanka
 Vyhoda
 Vyly
 Vynohradiv-Zakarpatskyi
 Vyrivka
 Vyry
 Vyshneve
 Vyshnivetske
 Vyska
 Vysokopillia
 Vysotske
 Vysun

Y
 Yablonka
 Yabluchne
 Yablunets
 Yahilnytsia
 Yahodyn (Eksp. Pkp)
 Yahodyn
 Yahotyn
 Yakovlivka
 Yakymivka
 Yamnytsia
 Yampil
 Yaniv
 Yanpil
 Yantseve
 Yaremche
 Yaresky
 Yarmolyntsi
 Yaroshenka
 Yarovatka
 Yaryshivka
 Yasenytsia
 Yasinia
 Yasna Zoria
 Yavkyne
 Yavora
 Yazykove
 Yelyzavetivka
 Yeremiivka
 Yezupil
 Yurkivka
 Yuskivtsi
 Yuzhnoukrainska

Z
 Zabolotiv
 Zabolottsi
 Zachativska
 Zadviria
 Zafativka
 Zaitseve
 Zakhidnyi
 Zakomelska
 Zalishchyky
 Zalissia
 Zaliznychne
 Zalizobetonnyi
 Zanky
 Zaoskillia
 Zaplazy
 Zaporizhzhia I
 Zaporizhzhia Ii
 Zaporizhzhia-Kamianske
 Zaporizhzhia-Male
 Zaporizhzhia-Vantazhne
 Zaporizhzhia
 Zaporizka Sich
 Zapovitne
 Zapytiv
 Zaruddia
 Zasillia
 Zasullia
 Zatoka
 Zatyshshia
 Zavallia
 Zavialivka
 Zavorychi
 Zboriv
 Zdolbuniv-Pivdennyi
 Zdolbuniv
 Zelena
 Zelenyi Hai
 Zelenyi Kolodiaz
 Zernove
 Zghoda
 Zherebkove
 Zhmerinka-Tov.
 Zhmerynka-Podilska
 Zhmerynka
 Zhornava
 Zhovti Vody I
 Zhukotky
 Zhuravlivka
 Zhuravno
 Zhuravok
 Zhykhor
 Zhytomyr
 Ziatkivtsi
 Zlochiv
 Zmiiv
 Znamianka-Pas.
 Znamianka
 Zolotonosha-1
 Zovna
 Zup. Punkt 3 Km
 Zup. Punkt 5 Km
 Zup. Punkt 5 Park
 Zup. Punkt 9 Km
 Z.P. 10 Km
 Zup. Punkt 25 Km
 Zup. Punkt 34 Km
 Zup. Punkt 40 Km
 Zup. Punkt 42 Km
 Zup. Punkt 45 Km
 Zup. Punkt 48 Km
 Zup. Punkt 49 Km
 Zup. Punkt 51 Km
 Zup. Punkt 52 Km
 Zup. Punkt 59 Km
 Zup. Punkt 60 Km
 Zup. Punkt 68 Km
 Zup. Punkt 70 Km
 Zup. Punkt 75 Km
 Zup. Punkt 83 Km
 Zup. Punkt 85 Km
 Zup. Punkt 93 Km
 Zup. Punkt 99 Km
 Zup. Punkt 102 Km
 Zup. Punkt 105 Km
 Zup. Punkt 110 Km
 Zup. Punkt 114 Km
 Zup. Punkt 116 Km
 Zup. Punkt 118 Km
 Zup. Punkt 123 Km
 Zup. Punkt 129 Km
 Zup. Punkt 133 Km
 Zup. Punkt 138 Km
 Zup. Punkt 142 Km
 Zup. Punkt 148 Km
 Zup. Punkt 150 Km
 Zup. Punkt 159 Km
 Zup. Punkt 168 Km
 Zup. Punkt 185 Km
 Zup. Punkt 198 Km
 Zup. Punkt 218 Km
 Zup. Punkt 239 Km
 Zup. Punkt 289 Km
 Zup. Punkt 375 Km
 Zup. Punkt 669 Km
 Zup. Punkt 1029 Km
 Zvenyhorodka
 Zvyniache

Crimea
Crimea is territory recognized by a majority of countries as part of Ukraine, but de facto under control and administration of Russia.

 Armiansk railway station
 Dzhankoi railway station
 Kerch railway station
 Port Krym railway station
 Sevastopol railway station
 Simferopol railway station
 Vladislavovka railway station
 Yevpatoria railway station

References

Railway stations
Railway stations
Ukraine